Compton is an English surname. Notable people with the surname include:

 Allen T. Compton (1938–2008), justice of the Alaska Supreme Court
 Ann Compton (born 1947), American journalist
 Arthur Compton (1892–1962), American physicist and Nobel Prize winner, of the Compton effect
 Barnes Compton (1830–1898), Maryland congressman and state officeholder
 Billy Compton (1896–1976), English footballer
 Charles H. Compton (1880–1966), American librarian and educator
 Christian Compton (1929–2006), justice of the supreme court of Virginia
 Cliff Compton (born 1979), American professional wrestler, better known by his ring name, Domino
 David G. Compton (born 1930), British science fiction author
 Denis Compton (1918–1997), England cricketer and footballer
 Edward Compton (actor) (1854–1918), English actor-manager
 Edward Theodore Compton (1849–1921), English-born, German artist, illustrator, and mountain climber
 Lady Emily Compton (born 1980), English fashion model, editor, and stylist
 Erik Compton (born 1979), Norwegian-American professional golfer
 F. E. Compton, publisher
 Fay Compton (1894–1974), English actress 
 Francis Compton (Conservative politician) (1824–1915), English lawyer and Conservative MP
 Sir Francis Compton (c. 1629–1716), English soldier and MP for Warwick
 Frances Snow Compton, a pseudonym used by Henry Adams
 Henry Compton, Bishop of London
 Henry Compton (actor), English actor
 Herbert Eastwick Compton (1856–1906), English writer
 Ivy Compton-Burnett, English novelist
 John Compton, leader of Saint Lucia United Workers Party
 John Compton, London pipe & electronic organ maker
 Karl Taylor Compton (1887–1954), physicist, president of MIT
 Katie Compton, American bicycle racer
 Leslie Compton, English footballer and cricketer 
 Lynn Compton, lead prosecutor in the Sirhan Sirhan trial
 Nick Compton (born 1983), English cricketer
 O'Neal Compton (1951–2019), American film and television actor
 Patrick Compton (born 1952), South African cricketer
 Paul Compton (born 1961), English footballer and football manager
 Richard Compton (1938–2007), American actor
 Richard G. Compton (born 1955), chemist
 Richard Compton (cricketer) (born 1956), South African cricketer
 Robert Harold Compton (1886–1979), South African botanist
 Sean Compton, American Broadcast executive
 Spencer Compton, 1st Earl of Wilmington (c. 1674–1743), British statesman
 Virginia Frances Bateman or Bateman Compton (1853–1940), American-born British actor-manager
 Walter Ames Compton (1911–1990), American Doctor and Japanese sword collector.
 Wayde Compton (born 1972), Canadian writer
 William Compton (courtier) (c. 1482–1528), lover of Henry VIII's mistress, Anne Stafford
 Wilson Martindale Compton (1890–1967), fifth president of Washington State University

See also
 Compton Mackenzie (1883–1972), Scottish novelist, brother of Fay Compton

English-language surnames